Afro-Yemenis or Black Yemenis refer to ethnic groups of Yemen who are belong to African race or Black race:

 Soqotri people, a Semitic ethnic group
 Al-Akhdam,  an Arabic-speaking ethnic group